is a Japanese women's professional shogi player ranked 2-dan.

Women's shogi professional
Sadamasu advanced to the finals of the 2nd  in August 2016, but lost to Mana Watanabe.

Promotion history
Sadamasu's promotion history is as follows:
 2-kyū: October 1, 2003
 1-kyū: April 1, 2007
 1-dan: April 1, 2013
 2-dan: January 19, 2021
Note: All ranks are women's professional ranks.

References

External links
 ShogiHub: Sadamasu, Minami

Japanese shogi players
Living people
Women's professional shogi players
Professional shogi players from Tokyo Metropolis
People from Fuchū, Tokyo
1986 births